The R562 is a Regional Route in Gauteng, South Africa that connects Diepsloot with Olifantsfontein (Clayville) and Tembisa via Midrand.

Route
Its western terminus is an intersection with the R511 Road and the N14 Highway at Diepsloot. It heads east as Summit Road, passing by Bridle Park and crossing the R55 to enter Midrand.

At the junction with the R55, the R562 changes its street name to Olifantsfontein Road and continues eastwards, separating the Country View and Noordwyk suburbs of Midrand. Just after Noordwyk, the R562 meets the N1 Highway (Ben Schoeman Highway) and enters the suburb of Randjespark.

Just after the N1 interchange, the R562 forms an intersection with the R101 (Old Pretoria Main Road). The R101 and the R562 are one road northwards for 1.6 km before the R562 becomes its own road eastwards, named Winnie Madikizela-Mandela Drive (previously Olifantsfontein Road), to form the northern border of the Glen Austin suburb. Just after the Randjesfontein suburb of Midrand, the R562 leaves the City of Johannesburg Metropolitan Municipality and enters the City of Ekurhuleni Metropolitan Municipality.

In Ekurhuleni, the R562 forms the southern border of the town of Olifantsfontein (Clayville) and the northern border of the township of Tembisa. It forms a junction with the M57 Metropolitan Route of Johannesburg just south of Clayville East before reaching its eastern terminus at an interchange with the R21 Highway.

References

Regional Routes in Gauteng